Mir’at al-Sharq, (Arabic: Mirror of the East) was a Palestinian newspaper published in the British mandate of Palestine during the period between 1919 and 1939.

History and profile
Mir’at al-Sharq was founded in Jerusalem in September 1919 by Bulus Shihadah, a Christian Palestinian from Ramallah. The paper appeared weekly. In the early years it published articles in both Arabic and English languages, but then it became an Arabic publication. 

The paper often blurred the lines between “news” and “editorials,". Political commentary was often accompanied by telegrams, notices and news. Front-page articles often dove didactically into political and social issues. Qustandi has argued as well that the newspaper was among the most significant papers published in Palestine during the Mandate period and reflected the most significant events of the day.

Shihadah supported the opposition faction in Palestinian politics during the Mandate period. Zachary J. Foster has argued that:"In its attempt to discredit the Husseini-dominated national leadership, the paper frequently looked to Egypt, Syria, Turkey and elsewhere with examples of more successful national movements in order to emulate their achievements and sidestep their blunders."  After the early-mid 1920s, Foster claims that "many Palestinians came under the influence of their neighbors in the Arab world and beyond to a much greater extent than has been acknowledged."

Mir’at al-Sharq adopted a pro-British political stance which led to the attack of its offices in 1925. The paper ceased publication in 1939.

References

External links
Mir'at al-Sharq

1919 establishments in British-administered Palestine
Arab culture in Jerusalem
Arabic-language newspapers published in Israel
Mass media in Jerusalem
Newspapers established in 1919
Newspapers published in Mandatory Palestine
Publications disestablished in 1939
Defunct weekly newspapers
English-language newspapers published in Arab countries
1939 disestablishments in Mandatory Palestine